Eberhard Frowein (1881–1964) was a German screenwriter and film director. He was also a director of the Comedia-Film production company. As a screenwriter he is noted for his work on the controversial 1941 Nazi film I Accuse. He later retired to Austria.

Selected filmography

Director
 The Pearl Maker of Madrid (1921)
 Marriage (1929)
 Fertility (1929)

Screenwriter
 The Wig (1925)
 The Flower Girl from the Grand Hotel (1934)
 Demon of the Himalayas (1935)
 By a Silken Thread (1938)
 Target in the Clouds (1939)
 I Accuse (1941)

References

Bibliography
 Hailey, Christopher. Franz Schreker: 1878-1934: A Cultural Biography. CUP Archive, 1993.
 Welch, David. Propaganda and the German Cinema, 1933-1945. I.B.Tauris, 2001.

External links
 

1881 births
1964 deaths
Film people from North Rhine-Westphalia
Mass media people from Wuppertal